Međimurje County is a triangle-shaped county in the northernmost part of Croatia, roughly corresponding to the historical and geographical region of Međimurje. Despite being the smallest Croatian county by size, it is the most densely populated one (not including the City of Zagreb). The county seat is Čakovec, which is also the largest city of the county.

The county borders Slovenia in the north-west and Hungary in the east, with about 30 kilometers of Slovenian territory separating it from Austria. The south-eastern corner of the county is near the town of Legrad and the confluence of the Mura into the Drava. The closest bigger cities include Varaždin, Koprivnica and Bjelovar in Croatia, Lendava, Murska Sobota and Maribor in Slovenia, as well as Nagykanizsa in Hungary and Graz in Austria. The Croatian capital of Zagreb is about 90 kilometers south-west of Čakovec.

There are slopes of the Alpine foothills in the north-western part of the county, the Upper Međimurje, making it suitable for vineyards. The south-eastern part of the county, the Lower Međimurje, touches the flat Pannonian Plain. The flat parts of the region are also largely used for agriculture, which mostly includes fields of cereals, maize and potato, as well as orchards, which are mostly planted with apple trees. There are two major hydroelectric power plants along the southern border of the county, on the Drava River.

Name and symbols

Besides its Croatian name (Međimurska županija), the county is also known as Muraköz megye in Hungarian, Medžimurska županija in Slovene, and Murinsel in German.

Throughout the past, the historical region of Međimurje was referred to by several names. In Latin, it was called Insula intra Dravum et Muram, Insula Muro-Dravana and Hortus Slavoniae Superior (or Hortus Croatiae). The names Insula intra Dravum et Muram and Insula Muro-Dravana mean "island between the Mura and the Drava", referring to the two rivers bordering the region. The name Hortus Croatiae means "the [flower] garden of Croatia". In Hungarian, the region is known as Muraköz, and in German as Murinsel. In Croatian, it was referred to by several names as well, including Mejmorje, Medžmorje and Medžimorje (in Kajkavian), as well as Međumurje and Međimurje (in Shtokavian).

The Kajkavian toponym Medžimorje is believed to have been the original name of the region. It originated in the 6th or 7th century, which makes it older than the Latin toponyms that were first mentioned in feudalism. The name Medžimorje is derived from the Proto-Slavic preposition medji and the noun morje. It literally means "land surrounded by water", i.e. "island". Međimorje is also an archaic common noun that was used in Kajkavian Croatian, also meaning "island". However, the names Međimurje (Shtokavian Croatian), Muraköz (Hungarian), and Murinsel (German) all contain the hydronym Mura (or Mur). The name Murinsel means "island on the Mura". This led to some dilemmas in the usage of the Croatian names Međimorje and Međimurje. In Kajkavian Croatian the name is Medžimurje, or Medžimorje, and in the Prekmurje dialect it is Medmürje or Nedžimurje.

The region's unofficial symbols include the turtle dove (Croatian: grlica gugutka, but locally referred to just as grlica), which is one of the most common birds in the region, and the violet (ljubičica). The region is often called Međimurje malo, which is Croatian for "Little Međimurje".

Geography

Međimurje County covers the plains between two rivers – the Mura and the Drava. The Mura flows along the county's northern border with the Slovenian region of Prekmurje (Municipality of Lendava, Municipality of Ljutomer and Municipality of Ormož) and its eastern border with Hungary's Zala County, while the Drava flows along the county's southern border with two other Croatian counties – Varaždin County and Koprivnica-Križevci County. The Trnava River flows through the middle of the county.

There are two reservoir lakes on the Drava – Lake Varaždin and Lake Dubrava – both built to serve the two hydroelectric power plants based in the county. Lake Dubrava, located near the city of Prelog, is the biggest artificial lake in Croatia and the second largest lake overall in the country. The power plant using Lake Varaždin is named after the county seat, Čakovec, while the one using Lake Dubrava is named Dubrava, taking its name from the nearby village of Donja Dubrava.

The county's elevation ranges between 120 and 344 metres above sea level, the latter being the elevation of its highest hill, Mohokos. Čakovec has an elevation of between 160 and 165 metres above sea level. Throughout the past, there were occasional earthquakes in the region. One of significant strength hit the region in 1880, while another in 1738 devastated Čakovec and particularly the nearby Šenkovec.

Of the county's total area of 729.5 km2, around 360 km2 are used in agriculture. Due to the high population density, agricultural land is divided into 21,000 units averaging  each. 27.5 km2 are covered with orchards. 11 km2 is the hilly area, located in the north-western part of the county, with villages like Štrigova and numerous vineyards. Grasslands and forests cover an area of around 105 km2. The biggest forest is Murščak, located between Domašinec and Donji Hrašćan.

Climate
The climate is continental. Summers are quite hot. Daily temperatures during the summer months usually range between 20 °C and 30 °C, but can reach as high as 40 °C in July and August, when they can also stay above 30 °C for several days. Thunderstorms and rapid weather changes are common throughout the summer months, as well as in late spring, with a particularly stormy period being between mid-June and mid-July, when they often occur on a daily basis.

Springs and autumns are usually calm, although rapid weather changes can also be common during the two seasons. Winters can be very severe, with early-morning temperatures sometimes reaching as low as -20 °C. During the winter months, daily temperatures usually range between -10 °C and 10 °C. January is usually the coldest month, during which daily temperatures can stay below 0 °C for several days. Snowfall usually occurs between late October and early March. Fog can be a common early-morning occurrence between late summer and early spring, with all-day fog sometimes occurring during the coldest months.

Warm weather, with daily temperatures around 15 °C, can occur as early as mid-February and as late as mid-November. In early October and late March, daily temperatures can also reach as high as 20 °C. However, February and November are generally cold months, with occasional heavy snow and daily temperatures around 0 °C, while March and October are generally cool, with occasional light snow and daily temperatures ranging between 0 °C and 15 °C. In March and October, it is also common for the temperature to drop below 0 °C over night, even when the daily temperature is in the range between 10 °C and 15 °C.

Administrative division
There are three towns in Međimurje County – Čakovec, Prelog and Mursko Središće. The county seat, Čakovec, has an urban population of around 15,147, with a population of 27,820 in the administrative area.

There are also several municipalities in the county, with their seats including Belica, Dekanovec, Domašinec, Donja Dubrava, Donji Kraljevec, Donji Vidovec, Goričan, Gornji Mihaljevec, Kotoriba, Mala Subotica, Nedelišće, Orehovica, Podturen, Pribislavec, Selnica, Strahoninec, Sveta Marija, Sveti Juraj na Bregu, Sveti Martin na Muri, Šenkovec, Štrigova and Vratišinec. Nedelišće, Pribislavec, Strahoninec and Šenkovec are all located on the outskirts of Čakovec, with Belica approximately 5 kilometers from the city's centre.

If not including the City of Zagreb, Međimurje is the smallest Croatian county, with an area of 729.5 km2. Nevertheless, with an average population of 156 people/km2, it is the most densely populated Croatian county, again if the City of Zagreb is not included.

Demographics

In the 2011 census, the total population of the county was 113,804. During the same census, a total of 106,744 residents of the county identified themselves as Croats. The following ethnic minorities were represented by more than 100 people in the 2011 census: Romani (5,107), Slovenes (516), Serbs (249), Albanians (200), and Russians (137).

The demographics of the region changed swiftly in the period between 1950 and 1975, with a significant reduction in the size of the family. From the national perspective, the population is moving toward the Istria region, while the seasonal workforce moves toward Zagreb and the southern parts of Croatia. The natural population increase is minimal.

Language and education

The official language of Međimurje County, as in the whole of Croatia, is the Shtokavian dialect of Croatian. However, the local dialect is Kajkavian, which is commonly spoken and understood among the people native to the region. In Kajkavian there is a number of Hungarian and German loanwords, but the Međimurian Kajkavian dialect sees the strongest Hungarian and German influence. The Međimurian dialect forms dialect continuum to the Prekmurje dialect (Southern Dolinsko dialect near Lendava) and the dialect of Prlekija. The artists of the Međimurje seek to cultivate the local dialect, including Franjo Mesarić–Frenki writer and poet, and Vlado Mihaljević, writer, singer, cantor and searcher.

Each municipality seat has an eight-year elementary school. However, there are also local schools in many smaller villages within each municipality, where the pupils can complete the first four years of their primary education. After that, they are moved to the main school of their municipality to complete the remaining four years, usually travelling to the school by a school bus.

Čakovec has three eight-year elementary schools. There are also several high schools in Čakovec, including the Gymnasium and schools offering secondary education for jobs in technology, industry, transport, construction, economy and trade. The smaller city of Prelog also offers secondary education for jobs in catering, tourism and economy.

The city of Čakovec also has two institutions of higher education – the Faculty of Teacher Education (Učiteljski fakultet) and the Polytechnic of Međimurje (Međimursko veleučilište). The Faculty of Teacher Education in Čakovec is part of the University of Zagreb.

History

Early history

The first organized human habitations here can be traced back to the Stone Age. There is a Neolithic site called Ferenčica near Prelog. There are archaeological sites that date from the Bronze Age, and 3rd century sites called Ciglišće and Varaščine .

During the Iron Age, the Indo-European tribes identified in the area were Celts, Serets and Pannons, and the region became part of the Roman empire. In the 1st century, the Romans knew the area as Insula intra Dravam et Muram ("island between the Drava and Mura rivers") according to the geographer Strabo. The region was part of the Roman province of Pannonia and later part of the Pannonia Superior.

Čakovec was originally called Aquama ("the wet city"), because the area was marshland. During the Migration Period, many different tribes, such as Huns, Visigoths, and Ostrogoths, passed through the region. The region was part of the Kingdom of the Ostrogoths, the state of the Lombards, the Avar Khaganate, and the Frankish Kingdom. The Slavs, which settled this region in the 6th century, gained independence after destruction of the Avar Khaganate. In the 9th century, it was included in the Slavic state of Lower Pannonia. According to some sources, the area was also part of the Great Moravia.

Medieval history
The Hungarians occupied the region in 896 and expanded to the river Sava, but as the Principality of Hungary transformed to the Kingdom of Hungary, the borders with the Kingdom of Croatia were set along the river Drava. In 1102 Croatia entered a personal union with the Kingdom of Hungary. During 13th century tradesmen and merchants (mostly ethnic Germans) started to arrive and began to develop the urban localities that are present today. Prelog (Perlak) was founded in 1264, shortly after the invasion of the Mongols in 1242, and the other settlements followed. Later it was part of Zala County. In the beginning of the 14th century, the area was ruled by powerful semi-independent oligarch Henrik Kőszegi.

Čakovec (Csáktornya) got its name from Count Dimitry Csáky, who at the beginning of the 13th century erected the timber fortification that eventually was "Csáky's tower", mentioned for the first time in 1328. King Charles I named Čakovec as the capitol in 1333. In 1350, King Louis I. gave the land to viceroy (Ban) Stjepan I Lacković, a member of the ruling Lacković family of Transylvania. It remained Lacković property until 1397, when King Sigismund executed Stjepan II Lacković, and took back the area to the Crown.

In 1405, the Celje family received Međimurje (Muraköz) as a gift from the Crown, and the land was mortgaged. The monastery in Goričan (Goritsán) managed the administration of the seat of the main territorial dominion as an attorney of the Celje family. King Matthias Corvinus bought the mortgage and donated the land to John I Ernuszt and his son, who were Jewish merchants from Sweden, living in Buda. The monastery in Goričan, which had managed the administration of the seat of the main territorial dominion, was dissolved. The seat of the administration of the main territorial dominion Goričan came under the administration of the Bishop of Ljubljana. It remained in the hands of the Ernušts until 1526, when the family died out without heir.

Since 1526, the region became part of the Habsburg monarchy, as did Kingdom of Hungary along with Croatia. It followed a succession and inheritance dispute between the Keglević family and the Habsburg Emperor Ferdinand I. Since 1530 until 1790 Goričan was by interdictum under the administration of the Bishop of Zagreb as an attorney of both the Emperor and the Keglević family to prevent any violent confrontations between them both, but Čakovec became the seat of the administration of the main territorial dominion in 1546, because even the Bishop Simon Erdődy (1518–1543, Bishop of Zagreb) could not prevent a violent confrontation between the Emperor and Petar Keglević in 1542/43. In 1546 the Diet in Pressburg (Pozsony, today's Bratislava) approved the transfer of Čakovec and Međimurje to Nikola Šubić Zrinski.

Rapid development began in 1547 under the ruling Zrinski family. In 1579 the craftsmen and merchants outside the walls of Čakovec Castle (csáktornyai kastély) were granted the right to trade; this was the beginning of the formal and legal city structure. The area was of importance as a trade center with Habsburg Kingdom of Croatia and Habsburg Kingdom of Hungary positioned nearby on the main roads, facilitating the exchange of goods, crafts and ideas. The region was also a military buffer zone against the expanding Ottoman Empire.

Nikola Šubić Zrinski ruled as Nicholas IV (1508–1566). He was a hero of the Battle of Szigetvár of the Habsburg-Ottoman wars. Then followed his son, Juraj IV Zrinski (George IV), until 1603, and his grandson Nikola VI. Zrinski (Nicholas VI) until 1624. Next was another grandson, a brother of Nicholas VI, Juraj V Zrinski (George V). He was poisoned in 1626 by the general Albrecht Wallenstein in Pressburg and was buried in Pauline Monastery of Sveta Jelena (St. Helen in English) near Čakovec, next to the graves of his ancestors. He was followed by his son Nikola VII Zrinski (Nicholas VII), (1620–1664), a famous Croatian Ban. At the coronation of Ferdinand IV, he carried the sword of state and was made Captain General of Croatia. He was killed while hunting in the forest near Kuršanec (Kursanecz), apparently by a wounded wild boar, but there were rumors that he had been murdered by the order of the Habsburg court. His brother, Petar Zrinski (Peter IV), was noted for his role in the attempted Croatian-Hungarian rebellion of 1664-1670 which ultimately led to his execution for treason. His wife, Katarina Zrinska, died imprisoned for the same offence on 16 November 1673 in Graz. On 19 August 1691 the son of Nicholas VII, Adam Zrinski, fell at Battle of Slankamen while fighting against the Ottoman Empire. Parts of Međimurje remained in the hands of the Zrinski family until the end of the 17th century. The last male member of the family, Ivan Antun Zrinski (John IV), died in prison in 1703.

In 1715, during the period of Charles VI, Holy Roman Emperor, Count Michael Althan became the owner of Međimurje; he received the land for his loyal services. In 1720, the region was detached from Croatia and was included into the main part of the Habsburg Kingdom of Hungary. In 1738, Čakovec Castle was hit by an earthquake, which caused tremendous damage. The owners of the city made some repairs, but in 1741, fire caused additional damage. The castle started to decay.

The Church of St. Jerome was rebuilt in 1749 in Štrigova (Stridóvár) by the famous artist Ivan Ranger following the demolition of the original 15th century-built chapel by an earthquake in 1738.

Ignacije Szentmartony, a Jesuit from Kotoriba (Kottori), was a royal mathematician and astronomer in Lisbon and in 1754 an explorer of Brazil on behalf of the Portuguese government.

In 1791 Count György Festetics bought Međimurje, including Čakovec Castle and Feštetić Castle (Festetics kastély) in the neighboring village of Pribislavec (Zalaújvár), which remained in the property of Feštetić family until 1923.

On 19 April 1848 Josip Jelačić proclaimed a union of Croatian provinces, and their separation from the Kingdom of Hungary. By 1868, the former status quo was restored. Within the years 1860 to 1889 the railroad was introduced, while in 1893 electric power started illuminating most of the city streets. According to the 1910 census, the population of Međimurje numbered 90,387 people, including 82,829 Croats and 6,766 Hungarians.

The Magyarization between the 1870s-1910s introduced the concept of Međimurian language (muraközi nyelv). According to this view, the spoken language in Međimurje was not Croatian or Kajkavian, but Međimurian Slavic, which is a separate Slavic language-family. József Margitai was the main propagandist of the Međimurian language and he published few Međimurian books. The propagandists exploited idea that the Croatians are dissatisfied with the new Serbo-Croatian language.

Margitai propagated in Međimurian the usefulness of the assimilation in the Međimurje and the superiority of the Hungarian nation. The fake Međimurian literary language in fact was only little different from the Kajkavian literary language.

Modern history (after World War I)

In 1918, after the collapse of the monarchic union of Austria-Hungary, and after the disarmament of the local police, the Međimurje region fell into civil disorder. The National Council of Slovenes, Croats and Serbs  in Zagreb sent hastily assembled troops, which crossed the river Drava and reached Čakovec where they were defeated. In the second attempt to capture the region in late 1918, troops commanded by Slavko Kvaternik forced the Hungarian troops to abandon the region. On 9 January 1919, Međimurje joined to the newly created Kingdom of Serbs, Croats and Slovenes (later known as Yugoslavia).

In the Southern region, in the Slovene March (today the Prekmurje and Raba March near Szentgotthárd) there emerged independence-autonomy movements. József Klekl expressed the program of the autonomous (or independent) Slovene March. Oszkár Jászi, who is supported the Slovene and Croatian minority, completed the program in a proposal: the Slovene March and the Međimurje should be merged. The program did not materialize.

Until 1922 the region was part of Varaždin County. From 1922 to 1929 the region was part of the Maribor Oblast, from 1929 to 1939 part of the Sava Banovina and from 1939 to 1941 part of the Banovina of Croatia.

Upon signing the Tripartite Pact on 25 March 1941, the Kingdom of Yugoslavia became a member of the Axis powers. In spite of this, after the coup Yugoslavia was invaded by Axis forces on 6 April 1941 and was subsequently occupied and partitioned. Between 1941 and 1945, Međimurje was occupied and annexed by Hungary. At this time some re-settlement of ethnic Croats who were settled in the region after 1918 occurred. Bulgarian troops within the Soviet 3rd Ukrainian Front captured the region in the spring of 1945, and the region became part of the socialist Croatia within restored Yugoslavia.

Culture and cuisine

Festivals

One notable traditional festival is the Fašnik, a carnival-like event held in February. The event's name is derived from the German word Fasching, describing similar events mostly held in Austria and Bavaria. The festival has been observed for centuries, with masked people participating in public parades and celebrations to drive off the demons of darkness and winter. The main festivities of the Fašnik period are usually held in the centre of Čakovec, with a parade of masked people from the entire region walking through the city's streets to reach its central square, where a hanged hay doll representing the Fašnik is traditionally burned down to signify victory over the demons of darkness and winter, as well as to mark the end of festivities.

Another notable and highly attended festival held in Čakovec is the Porcijunkulovo, an annual fair which takes place on the streets around the city's centre between 30 July and 5 August. At the fair, many of the region's traditional products, such as baskets, can be purchased and people can also see how some of the products are made. Many of the region's traditional foods are served during the festivities and there is a daily entertainment program at a temporary stage set up at the city's central square.

Food
For many centuries, Međimurje was part of Hungary, whose influence is evident in its history and culture. Once, the only notable place where one could have experienced the local cuisine and culture was Međimurska hiža, a restaurant near the village of Mačkovec, about 5 kilometers north of Čakovec. The restaurant was heavily damaged by fire in the late 1990s and never reopened. However, a number of new restaurants serving the region's traditional food have opened over the years.

The traditional food during the Fašnik period are a type of doughnuts known in Croatian as krafne, although the local people also use several similar names for the food. As well as being the traditional food of the Fašnik period, krafne are also a popular everyday food in the region and are sold in local stores and bakeries throughout the year. The traditional food of the Porcijunkulovo festivities is lángos, whose name is spelled langoš in Croatian. Another notable sweet food is a type of nut roll called orehnjača, which is filled with walnut cream. Its name is derived from oreh, meaning "walnut" in the local Kajkavian dialect. A similar cake filled with poppy seed is called makovnjača, with its name derived from mak, the Croatian word for poppy.

There is also a type of corn mush called žganci, which is usually served with liquid sour cream, buttermilk or warm milk. Cottage cheese is also a popular food in the region. It can either be served with liquid sour cream to form a dish known in the local dialect as sir z vrhnjom, which translates as "cheese with cream", or used to make turoš, in which case it is cone-shaped and dried. Sir z vrhnjom is often spiced with red paprika, which is also one of the main ingredients in turoš. Cottage cheese is also used as one of the fillings in a pastry called štrukli.

Some of the other traditional foods of the region include a type of pasta called mlinci, white and black sausages, known as čurke, which is served with sour cabbage, as well as other dried or otherwise preserved meat, such as meso z tiblice, which is stored in a small, usually wooden barrel called tiblica. There are also some vegetable dishes, while the production of wine is ubiquitous in the hilly landscape of the region's northwest. The diet of the region is part of the Croatian cuisine, which is known for its diversity.

Recreation
There are spas used for recreation in Vučkovec and around Sveti Martin na Muri, both in the northern part of the county and near the Mura. There are also more than 200 clubs for various sporting and recreational activities such as mountaineering, fishing, bowling, CB radio, parachuting and flying small aircraft, including unpowered gliders and powered hang gliders. Hunting also attracts numerous hunters in low game and birds.

Other cultural notes

The Škola Animiranog Filma is a school of animation based in Čakovec.

In Čakovec Castle, there is a museum and an art gallery. In Šenkovec, in the chapel of Sveta Jelena.  and in the church of Sveti Jeronim in Štrigova, there are Baroque frescoes of Ivan Ranger dating between 1776 and 1786. Prelog is home to the beautiful church of  Sveti Jakob, built in 1761.

More than 15,000 local songs have been collected here by ethnomusicologist Vinko Žganec. He was influenced in his work by Franjo Kuhač, and encouraged by Hungarian composer Béla Bartók. The German national anthem, Das Lied der Deutschen, composed by Joseph Haydn, is thought by some scholars to be derived from the folk song known in Međimurje under the name Stal Se Jesem; for details, see Gott erhalte Franz den Kaiser. An Austrian national song was composed by Franz von Suppé, who was born in Split, and the lyrics of the Austrian national anthem were written by Paula von Preradovic, granddaughter of poet Petar Preradović, born near Pitomača.

Transport

The region of Međimurje is a strong transport hub. The main roads and railroads going through the county connect several Central and Eastern European countries with the Croatian cities of Varaždin, Zagreb (the country's capital), Karlovac, and Rijeka (the country's principal seaport), as well as the rest of the Croatian part of the Adriatic coast, which is a popular summer destination for tourists.

Međimurje had three railroads. M501 railway is the line of international significance that connects Međimurje with Hungary and Slovenia. M501 railway was part of first railroad in the county that was built in 1860, connecting Budapest with the Adriatic ports of Rijeka and Trieste, and this was  first railroad ever built in the present-day Croatia. The village of Kotoriba, located near the Hungarian border in the south-eastern part of the county, was the site of the first railway station building in Croatia.  R201 railway connects Čakovec with Varaždin and Zagreb. L101 railway connects Čakovec with Mursko Središće and with Slovenian town of Lendava.

Around 21 kilometers of the A4 motorway, built in the 1990s, is located within the county's borders. The highway connects Hungary with Zagreb, and is also an important connection from Čakovec and Prelog to Zagreb, as it can be accessed near the village of Sveti Križ, located approximately halfway between the two cities. The Goričan Border Crossing and the Zrinski Bridge are also located on the highway. Near Zagreb, the A4 highway is connected with the A1 motorway, from which several cities along the Adriatic coast can be reached, as well as the A3 motorway, which goes through the southern parts of Slavonia all the way to the Serbian border.

A small sports airfield with one grassy runway is located near the village of Pribislavec, just outside Čakovec. It is mainly used by light aircraft and unpowered gliders. Panoramic flights over the region are also organised from the airfield. Occasionally, the airfield is also used by powered hang gliders, although these aircraft more commonly use a smaller airfield on the shores of the Drava, just outside Prelog. For many years, the airfield in Pribislavec also hosted an annual air show in August, which, however, was not held in 2009 and 2010. There are plans in the works to build a bridge over the Mura River to connect the villages of Kerkaszentkirály in Hungary and Podturen in Međimurje County.

Business, economy and resources

An estimated 22,000 people are employed in the county, with around 60% of them in bigger companies. Since the late 1960s and early 1970s, more than 17,000 people from the region have been employed abroad, in Austria, Germany, Switzerland, and beyond. The region is considered one of the nation's richest and most prosperous.

Agriculture and food production
Throughout its history, the region was heavily agricultural and even today many work in that sector. The total percentage of people involved in agriculture is 12.7%, which is above the national average.

Since the 4th century BC, there have been ship mills in use, particularly along the Mura River, some of which remained in use until the 20th century. The last surviving ship mill in the county is also located on the Mura River, between Sveti Martin na Muri and Mursko Središće. It is now a historic monument and a well-known regional tourist attraction. The famous Međimurje horse (Međimurski konj) breed of horses was for many years harnessed to the streetcars of Vienna.

Some of the largest food companies in the region include Agromeđimurje, Čakovečki mlinovi and Vajda. METSS, formerly called Trgocentar, operates a large number of convenience stores in the region. In Čakovec, many people are also employed in a number of shopping malls run by local, national and international companies.

Manufacturing
Industry has mostly developed in and around Čakovec, as well as in the south-eastern parts of the county. Međimurska trikotaža Čakovec or MTČ was one of the most successful textile and clothing companies in northern Croatia for years. Some of the other well known clothing companies in the region include Čateks and the Mursko Središće-based Modeks. There are also some footwear companies based in the region, the most prominent of them being Jelen.

The Čakovec-based Zrinski is a printing and publishing company. Nedelišće was home to one of the first Croatian printing presses, operating there as early as 1570. The production of metal and PVC is significant in the region. There are several construction companies based in the region. Some of the largest local companies in these businesses include Ferro-Preis, TMT, Tehnix, Meplast, Muraplast, Tegra and Beton. Basket weaving is one of the oldest businesses in the region, with Međimurjeplet being the largest local company. Chairs, small items of furniture and other decorative items are also woven in addition to baskets. The most common weaving materials include twigs, rattan and bamboo.

Mining
There are deposits of coal around Mursko Središće, Peklenica and Lopatinec. Lopatinec got its name from lopata, the Croatian word for "shovel". Coal mining was part of the local economy between 1946 and 1972, but has eventually become unprofitable. The total output at that time was close to 4,600,000 tonnes.  Estimated reserves are 200,000,000 tonnes, although new technologies and approaches would be needed to extract it profitably. The village of Križovec might be the only place in the world where people extract coal by pulling it by hand from the bottom of the river.

Gold can be found in the sands of both the Mura and Drava Rivers. In 1955, a geological survey calculated the concentration of gold in the Drava to be between 2.5 and 24.4 mg/m3, occasionally reaching 111 to 150 mg/m3. On the banks of Drava river near Donji Vidovec, one can still witness the process of gold prospecting as it used to be practiced during the gold rush.
In historical times, Prelog was the center for distribution of rock salt for this part of the kingdom.

Oil and gas
The region was the first in Croatia where deposits of gas and crude oil were found, in 1856, around the villages of Selnica and Peklenica. The latter even got its name from pekel, the word for "hell" in the local Kajkavian dialect, since the people quickly noticed the peculiar properties of the dark, greasy liquid in small ponds appearing spontaneously on the ground. The reserves were initially calculated to be around 170,000 tonnes. There was exploitation from 1886 to 1889 and into the 20th century.

The first crude oil pipeline built in this part of Europe was between Mursko Središće and the nearby town of Selnica in 1901. At that time the annual production was less than 7,000 tons. Today, a modern pipeline stretches from Omišalj on the Adriatic island of Krk and Sisak toward the oil refinery in the Slovenian city of Lendava, not far from Mursko Središće. There are also gas deposits in Mihovljan, a suburban village on the northern outskirts of Čakovec.

Hydroelectric and geothermal resources
There are three hydroelectric power plants with dams and two reservoir lakes built on the Drava. The Varaždin Hydroelectric Power plant fed from Lake Ormož, Čakovec Hydroelectric Power Plant is fed from the smaller Lake Varaždin and opened in 1982, while the Dubrava Hydroelectric Power Plant is fed from the larger Lake Dubrava and opened in 1989. The latter two hydroelectric power plants provide 161,6 MW of electric power. Their dams, levees, canals and reservoirs are also used for flood control and irrigation.

The extraction of gravel is also significant for the region. There is currently around 10 gravel pits, located in the southern and eastern parts of the region. During the 1990s, some of the gravel pits also became popular bathing and entertainment resorts during the summers, with restaurants and sports grounds built around them. Nowadays, the Totomore resort near the village of Totovec is the most notable resort of this kind, while a couple of other similar resorts closed during the early 2000s.

Geothermal resources also exist in the region, although they cannot be considered a profitable energy source. Instead, they are used for leisure and recreation.

Acknowledgements
 Međimurje has been named Green Destinations region at the ITB Berlin fair.

Gallery

Local notable people

 Lidija Bajuk - musician, entertainer
 Lujo Bezeredi - sculptor
 Dragutin Feletar - academician, historian writer
 Joža Horvat - adventurer, writer
 Robert Jarni - football player and manager
 Ladislav Kralj-Međimurec - painter
 Dražen Ladić - football player (goalkeeper) and manager
 Nikola Pavic - poet
 Franjo Punčec - tennis player
 Ivan Ranger - painter
 Rudolf Steiner - philosopher, thinker
 Ignacije Szentmartony - explorer
 Josip Štolcer-Slavenski - composer
 Nikola Zrinski - soldier, poet, philosopher
 Petar Zrinski - soldier
 Vinko Žganec - folklorist, ethnomusicologist

References

External links

 

 
Counties of Croatia
Historical regions in the Kingdom of Hungary